Fudbalski klub Spartak Ždrepčeva Krv is a professional football club from Subotica, Serbia, that plays in the Serbian SuperLiga.

The club was founded in 1945 and was named after Jovan Mikić Spartak, the leader of the Partisans in Subotica, who was a national hero and was killed in 1944.

After the end of the 2007–08 Serbian League Vojvodina, the club merged with Zlatibor Voda which won promotion to the Serbian First League thus gaining the name Spartak Zlatibor Voda. In 2013, the board decided to return to the original name of the club.

History

Origins 
Founded in 1945, FK Spartak Subotica is, after Vojvodina, the most successful club in northern Serbia. They participated in the first after-war club championship, in the 1946–47 Yugoslav First League and from then on, they played always in between the first and second national leagues. The biggest success of the club was achieved when the club played in the 1993–94 FR Yugoslavia Cup final against Partizan (1–6 loss).

However, football in Subotica has long tradition. During the pre-WWII period, the city was the seat of the Subotica Football Subassociation, one of the subassociations which existed within the Yugoslav Football Association, and which organised league competitions whose winners qualified for the Yugoslav championship where the national champion was decided. Subotica was home to three major clubs that made it to the Yugoslav championship before 1941: Bačka, SAND and ŽAK Subotica. Bačka has furthermore the record of being the oldest football club in the entire territory of former Yugoslavia.

When Second World War started in 1941 in Yugoslavia, Subotica was invaded by the Axis forces and incorporated into Hungary with its clubs being included in the Hungarian league system. At the end of the war Yugoslavia took control again of Subotica. Some clubs such as SAND were dissolved, others like Bačka kept existing although played a much lesser role from then on, and, some new ones were formed, like Radnički or Građanski. ŽAK Subotica kept being active for a while, however, their main sponsor, the Yugoslav Railways, decided to dissolve it and form a new club in its place which would be named "Spartak" which was the nickname of a legendary athlete from Subotica and World War II Yugoslav Partisans commander Jovan Mikić – Spartak. Besides the players, the stadium, the colors and the fans, Spartak also inherited from ŽAK the tradition of being backed by the Yugoslav Railways.

1946 to 2006 
During the period of socialist Yugoslavia, Spartak was a regular participant either in Yugoslav First or Second leagues. Although they never won the national championship, they were a feared adversary known for both, producing good homeground players that achieved quality careers domestically and abroad, and also bringing talented players from regions all around Yugoslavia. Spartak also contributed a number of players for the national team. During this period, the highlight was their presence as losing finalist of the 1961–62 Yugoslav Cup.

Spartak was cup finalist again, in the 1993–94 FR Yugoslavia Cup. By then the old SFR Yugoslavia broke-up and FR Yugoslavia formed by Serbia and Montenegro took its place. Spartak was a regular participant of the First League of FR Yugoslavia all way until 1999–2000 season when they were relegated and a period of crisis started.

During the first decade of the new millennium the club went downhills all way until 2008 when they merged with FK Zlatibor Voda from neighbouring town of Horgoš. Playing under the name FK Spartak Zlatibor Voda, the club started recovering finally reaching its come-back to top tier when they were promoted to the 2009–10 Serbian SuperLiga.

2006 till nowadays 
Spartak's biggest success since Serbia restored its name as country in 2006, came in the 2018–19 UEFA Europa League qualifying rounds. They first defeated Northern Irish club Coleraine F.C. in Round 1, then went on to achieve what is considered their brightest moment in club history defeating Czech powerhouse AC Sparta Prague over two legs. They were eventually eliminated from the UEFA Europa League in the 3rd qualifying round, losing to Danish club Brøndby IF over two games.

Supporters

Spartak's fans are known as Marinci (Marines), which were formed in early 1989.

Stadium

Subotica City Stadium (Gradski stadion) is a multi-use stadium in Subotica, Serbia. It is currently used mostly for football matches and is the club's home ground since 1945. The stadium holds 13,000 people. There is a football pitch and a registered track for athletics suitable for competitions. One part of the Stadium is covered. There are also two subsidiary football pitches.

Spartak in Europe

Mitropa Cup
The Mitropa Cup, officially called the La Coupe de l'Europe Centrale, was one of the first really international major European football cups that the club participated in. After World War II, in 1951, a replacement tournament named Zentropa Cup was held to resume the rich tradition of this competition.

UEFA competitions
 Qualified for Europe in 2 seasons

Honours
National Championships – 1
 People's Republic of Serbia League (Vojvodina group)
 Winners (1): 1945–46

Yugoslav Second League (4)
1952, 1971–72, 1985–86 (West), 1987–88 (West)
Yugoslav Cup:
Runners-up (2): 1961–62, 1993–94

Players

Current squad

Out on loan

Players with multiple nationalities
   Aleksandar Vidović

Notable players
To appear in this section a player must have either:
 Played at least 80 games for the club.
 Set a club record or won an individual award while at the club.
 Played at least one international match for their national team at any time.

 Milan Jovanić
 Andrija Kaluđerović
 Dejan Kekezović
 Ognjen Koroman
 Zoran Ljubinković
 Predrag Mijić
 Igor Popović
 Dejan Rončević
 Vojo Ubiparip
 Vladimir Veselinov
 Nemanja Vidić
 Nikola Žigić
 Miloš Cetina
 Zvonko Ćirić 
 Zoran Dimitrijević
 Milorad Đukanović
 Miloš Glončak
 Lajoš Jakovetić
 Gojko Janjić
 Senad Karač
 Zoltan Kujundžić
 Zoran Kuntić
 Slobodan Kustudić
 Ranko Leškov
 Dušan Maravić
 Dragan Miranović
 Tihomir Ognjanov
 Bela Palfi
 Antal Puhalak
 Zvonko Rašić
 Antun Rudinski
 Živko Slijepčević
 Dimitrije Stefanović
 Miloš Stojiljković
 Slobodan Šujica 
 Jožef Takač
 Antal Tapiška
 Tomislav Taušan
 Tim Chow
 Ivo Šeparović
 Dejan Antonić
 Zsombor Kerekes
 István Nyers
 Flórián Urbán
 Maxim Fedin
 Noboru Shimura
 Nikola Drinčić
 Vladimir Jovović
 Mladen Kašćelan
 Nemanja Nikolić
 Savo Pavićević
 Milan Purović
 Janko Tumbasević
 Nikola Vujović

For the list of all current and former players with Wikipedia article, please see: :Category:FK Spartak Subotica players.

Managers

 Ilija Rajković 
 Tihomir Ognjanov
 Milan Živadinović 
 Ljupko Petrović 
 Milutin Sredojević 
 Ranko Popović 
 Zoran Milinković 
 Dragan Miranović 
 Ilija Dobrić  
 Ljubomir Ristovski 
 Zoran Njeguš 
 Zoran Milinković 
 Zoran Marić 
 Petar Kurćubić 
 Dragi Kanatlarovski 
 Stevan Mojsilović 
 Andrey Chernyshov 
 Aleksandar Veselinović 
 Vladimir Gaćinović 
 Predrag Rogan 
 Vladimir Gaćinović  
 Vladimir Buač

Kit manufacturers and shirt sponsors

References

External links
 Official website 
 Blue Marines fans
 Club profile and squad at Srbijafudbal
 Club history at Sportski savez Subotice 
 Spartak Stats at Utakmica.rs

 
Football clubs in Serbia
Football clubs in Yugoslavia
Football clubs in Vojvodina
Association football clubs established in 1945
1945 establishments in Serbia
Sport in Subotica